Tokeland is a census-designated place (CDP) in Pacific County, Washington, United States. The population was 151 at the 2010 census, a sharp decrease from the 194 at the 2000 census.

The town was named after Chief Toke, an Indian chief of the 19th century.

Geography
Tokeland is located in Willapa Bay, by the mouth of the Cedar River. According to the United States Census Bureau, the CDP has a total area of 0.5 square miles (1.3 km2), all of it land.

Tsunami and inland flooding
During early talks to build a tsunami evacuation tower, studies were undertaken by the Shoalwater Bay Indian Tribe, in conjunction with several local, state, and federal agencies, that determined the Tokeland area could be hit by a tsunami  within a range of 10 to 22 minutes after an ensuing high-magnitude earthquake.

History
Tokeland is named after Chief Toke of the Shoalwater Bay Tribe. Toke made the area a summer home for himself and his family, and his presence was first documented there by Lieutenant John Meares after Toke approached Meares' ship in his canoe at the mouth of Willapa Bay in 1788.

In 1854, J. F. Barrows settled on Toke Point, but left only a few years later. No other known settlers appeared in the area until the arrival of George Brown in 1858. In 1885, Brown's daughter Lizzie, and her husband, William Kindred, built the Kindred Inn, which still stands as the current-day Tokeland Hotel. When the town's first post office was established in 1894, the Kindreds operated it, and continued doing so for 17 years. Lizzie Kindred was also partial owner of the Tokeland Oyster Company when it opened in 1905.

Tokeland became a popular enough destination that in 1910, a group of investors from Portland, Oregon sought to develop an amusement park there that would resemble Coney Island, although these plans never materialized.

Similarly to North Cove and other towns on the north side of Willapa Bay, coastal erosion became a serious concern for Tokeland. This, combined with the overall economic pressure affecting the nation during The Great Depression, caused a decline in the area's tourism industry in the 1930s and 1940s. The area's economy received a small boost starting in the 1950s, as recreational boating and fishing, combined with a surge in once-dwindling oyster harvests, rekindled many businesses. This led to the Port of Willapa Harbor making many improvements to Tokeland, including the 1974 addition of a new jetty, moorage, boat ramp, timber seawall, and fish buying station.

Tsunami evacuation tower

The Shoalwater Bay Indian Tribe built a  tsunami evacuation tower in 2022. The freestanding structure was built at a cost $5 million, $1.2 million supplied by the tribal council and an additional $3.8 million from the Federal Emergency Management Agency (FEMA). The tower is considered the first of its type in the United States. In honor of a tribal elder who guided the project to completion, the council bestowed the tower the nickname, "Auntie Lee".

Climate
This region experiences warm (but not hot) and dry summers, with no average monthly temperatures above 71.6 °F.  According to the Köppen Climate Classification system, Tokeland has a warm-summer Mediterranean climate, abbreviated "Csb" on climate maps.

Demographics
As of the census of 2000, there were 194 people, 89 households, and 50 families residing in the CDP. The population density was 379.0 people per square mile (146.9/km2). There were 197 housing units at an average density of 384.8/sq mi (149.1/km2). The racial makeup of the CDP was 90.21% White, 5.67% Native American, 1.03% Asian, and 3.09% from two or more races. 43.0% were of American, 14.5% Irish, 9.2% French and 5.7% Finnish ancestry according to Census 2000.

There were 89 households, out of which 21.3% had children under the age of 18 living with them, 43.8% were married couples living together, 7.9% had a female householder with no husband present, and 43.8% were non-families. 38.2% of all households were made up of individuals, and 20.2% had someone living alone who was 65 years of age or older. The average household size was 2.18 and the average family size was 2.84.

In the CDP, the population was spread out, with 20.1% under the age of 18, 5.7% from 18 to 24, 18.0% from 25 to 44, 34.5% from 45 to 64, and 21.6% who were 65 years of age or older. The median age was 48 years. For every 100 females, there were 106.4 males. For every 100 females age 18 and over, there were 106.7 males.

The median income for a household in the CDP was $24,531, and the median income for a family was $30,208. Males had a median income of $14,327 versus $0 for females. The per capita income for the CDP was $12,170. About 39.0% of families and 49.1% of the population were below the poverty line, including 83.3% of those under the age of eighteen and none of those 65 or over.

See also
 Willapa Bay
 Steamboats of Willapa Bay
 List of casinos

References 

Census-designated places in Pacific County, Washington
Census-designated places in Washington (state)
Populated coastal places in Washington (state)